"" is the territorial anthem of the overseas country of French Polynesia. It is sung during public or sport events alongside the French national anthem, "La Marseillaise". The lyrics are in Tahitian. It was adopted on 10 June 1993 by the Assembly of French Polynesia with the Loi du Pays 1993-60.

Lyrics

Gallery

Notes

References

National symbols of French Polynesia
Oceanian anthems
French anthems
National anthem compositions in F major